The 2012–13 New Zealand Figure Skating Championships was held at the Paradice in Botany Downs of Auckland from 29 September through 2 October 2012. Skaters competed in the disciplines of men's singles and ladies' singles across many levels, including senior, junior, novice, adult, and the pre-novice disciplines of juvenile, pre-primary, primary, and intermediate.

Senior results

Men

Ladies

External links
 2012–13 New Zealand Figure Skating Championships results

2012 in figure skating
2012-13
Figure Skating,2012-13
September 2012 sports events in New Zealand
October 2012 sports events in New Zealand